Kolašin (Montenegrin Cyrillic: Колашин) is a town in northern Montenegro. It has a population of 2,989 (2003 census). Kolašin is the centre of Kolašin Municipality (population 9,949) and an unofficial centre of Morača region, named after Morača River.

History

Ottoman period
Kolašin, fortress-settlement, was raised by the Turks in the middle of the 17th century in the namesake village in Nikšić district (nahiye). The village of Kolašin was first mentioned in the Sultan's Decree in 1565, by which the deceased Grand Duke Miloš was replaced by his son Todor. The Turkish town was named after the former village of Kolašin.

In 1651, Patriarch Gavrilo assigned Eparch of Zahumsko, the Eparchy of Nikšić, Plana, the Kolašinovićevs and the Morača to Basil of Ostrog. This document also, like the one from 1667, shows that the Orthodox Christian population of this region called the Kolašinovići, was organized in a recognized and respected tribal community of the Kolašinovićs. The historical science and sources recognize the surname Kolašinović. By all odds, the name was also derived, same as the name of the region, fortress – settlement and the tribe from the same source – the village of Kolašin.

It was in 1798 when young Mina Radović, the son of tke Duke Radule, who had been killed by the Turks, ambushed and killed Hasanbeg Mekić, who had come to collect taxes, in the vicinity of Morača monastery. The attack had been arranged with the Montenegrin ruler Petar I Petrović-Njegoš. Mina Radović received the title of Duke and, in 1799, during the convention of the people's prominent representatives of Montenegro and the Hills held in Cetinje, he was nominated a member of the Court Administration of Montenegro and the Hills, in charge of judicial and administrative power. This meant that the Montenegrin government considered the Morača region to be a legitimate part of Montenegro.

Late modern
Rebecca West visited the town of Kolasin in the 1930s where she learned that in the 18th century,Bosniaks Muslims and Orthodox Montenegrins lived in peace. In 1858, however, several Montenegrin tribes attacked the town and destroyed all the inhabitants who had kept their Bosniak identity or who were Muslim.

There is a document written by Duke Miljan Vukov, who headed the Vasojević tribe in that battle, about the attack on Kolašin in 1858. It was the bloodiest battle in all of Montenegro: I participated in many a battle as ? Flag bearer, captain and warlord – he testified – but none of them had been so fierce and bloody as was the battle for taking Kolašin in 1858, which was, truly, one of the bloodiest that had ever happened in the vicinity of Montenegro. 

The victory in that bloody battle established the new borders of Montenegro towards the regions that still remained under the Turkish rule. Fighting for liberation continued on the left bank of the Tara River around the Lower Kolašin villages. The Lipovo battle in 1872 is particularly remembered. There was no peace until the Congress of Berlin when Kolašin joined the principality Montenegro and later 1918. the Kingdom of Yugoslavia created immediately after the World War I, all until it was disintegrated.

By the decisions of the Congress of Berlin, in 1878, Kolašin officially became a part of Montenegro. This was preceded with fierce fighting with the Ottoman Empire over the Kolašin region. Constant battles had been waged by the members of Rovca, Drobnjaci, Morača, Vasojevići, Uskoci and other Serbian tribes of Montenegro to take this and other parts of the land from the Ottomans. 
During this period, Kolašin was home to a significant Bosniak community. They were largely expelled in different waves during the late 19th century [[Expulsion of the Bosniaks 1877–1878|expulsion of the Bosniaks] fleeing to Turkey, Skopje (Pristina) and Macedonia. The Montenegrin forces also robbed the Bosniaks before the expulsion. In May 1901, Bosniaks pillaged and partially burned the cities of Novi Pazar, Sjenica and Pristina, and massacred Serbs in the area of Kolašin.

Contemporary
The Bulgarian foreign ministry compiled a report about the five kazas (districs) of the sanjak of the Novi Pazar in 1901-02.  According to the Bulgarian report, the kaza of Kolašin was almost entirely populated by Bosniaks. According to it, the kaza of Kolašin had 27 Bosniak villages with 732 households and 5 Serb villages with 75 households.

A year or two after the Congress of Berlin, the Kolašin brigade of Montenegro's people's army was formed. During the World War I, by the end of 1915 and in the beginning of 1916, it played a major part under the command of Serdar Janko Vukotić as part of the Sandžak army. In the famous Battle of Mojkovac, it successfully defended the gates of Mojkovac having repelled all the attack by much more numerous soldiers of the Austro-Hungarian army.

In the liberation wars between 1912 and 1918, the brigade lost more than 1000 soldiers and officers.
In the Second World War, the Kolašin region again suffered hardship, heavy human casualties and destruction, including a Partisan massacre of over 350 civilians on Orthodox Christmas in January 1942. After the Italian capitulation, this part of Montenegro was free and so, on November 15 and 16, 1943, the First Session of the National Antifascist Council of Montenegro and Boka was held in Kolašin, attended by 544 delegates from all regions of Montenegro and 42 of them from Kolašin district, and its decisions were of critical importance for  reconstruction and rebuilding of the Montenegrin state. In those days, Kolašin was the war capital  of Montenegro.

The town of Kolašin changed hands several times between 1941 and 1944. It was bombarded 18 times by the Germans and Italians. Finally, on December 29, 1944, the town was conquered by the soldiers of the 5th Montenegrin Proletarian Brigade. In the national liberation struggle in the period of 1941–1945, more than 1400 soldiers from the Kolašin region took part and almost 400 died. Around 250 patriots lost their lives in various aggressors' torture chambers and on execution sites, and there were quite a lot of futile victims of fratricidal war.

Climate
The Köppen Climate Classification subtype for this climate is Dfb. (Warm Summer Continental Climate).

Sports
The local football team is former third tier club FK Gorštak, who play their home games at the Stadion u Lugu. The town's basketball team is KK Gorštak.

Tourism

Kolašin is one of the centres of Montenegro's mountain tourism. Although Žabljak is considered more attractive destination, Kolašin has the advantage of being easily accessible by road and rail.

Kolašin is located on the foot of Bjelasica and Sinjajevina mountains, which offer great conditions for skiing. Because of Kolašin's altitude (954 m), the town is considered an air spa.

Biogradska Gora national park is in the town's vicinity, and is considered a premium tourist attraction.
The development of Kolašin as a tourist destination is bolstered by opening of Bianca Resort & Spa, a luxury resort in town's center.

Transport

Kolašin is connected with rest of Montenegro by two-laned motorways. It is situated on the main road connecting Montenegro's coast and Podgorica with northern Montenegro and Serbia (E65, E80).

Kolašin is also a station on Belgrade–Bar railway.

Media 
 Ozon Radio

Notable people 
 Slavko Labović, a Danish Serbian actor
 Veljko Vlahović, Montenegrin communist politician
 Vlado Šćepanović, a Montenegrin professional basketball coach and former player
 Gavrilo V, Serbian Patriarch, 41st Patriarch of the Serbian Orthodox Church
 Milovan Jakšić, a former football goalkeeper
 Amfilohije Radović, Serbian Orthodox metropolitan bishop

International relations

Twin towns — Sister cities
Kolašin is twinned with:

 Lovech, Bulgaria
 Prijepolje, Serbia
 Slovianoserbsk, Ukraine

See also 
Bjelasica Mountain
Biogradska Gora National Park
Tourism in Montenegro

References

External links

 The official website for Kolašin tourism
 Kolašin municipality official website
 Kolašin info (English)
 Ski centre Kolašin1450

 
Populated places in Kolašin Municipality
Ski areas and resorts in Montenegro